742 Edisona is a minor planet orbiting the Sun that was discovered by German astronomer Franz Kaiser on February 23, 1913. It was named for inventor Thomas Edison. The orbital plane is inclined at an angle of 11.2° to the plane of the ecliptic. This is a member of the dynamic Eos family of asteroids that most likely formed as the result of a collisional breakup of a parent body.

It spans a girth of approximately 45.6 km.

References

External links
 
 

Eos asteroids
Edisona
Edisona
S-type asteroids (Tholen)
K-type asteroids (SMASS)
19130223